William Henry Welch, Sr. (June 1, 1805 – January 23, 1863) was an American jurist.

Born in Litchfield, Connecticut, Welch graduated from Yale University and Yale Law School. He moved to Minnesota Territory in 1850 and settled in St. Anthony (now Minneapolis). Welch served as a Justice of the Peace. From 1853 to 1858, Welch served as Chief Justice of the Minnesota Territorial Supreme Court as appointed by President Pierce. Welch was reappointed for another term by President Buchanan, but his term ended when Minnesota became a State. He moved to Red Wing, Minnesota in 1858 and died there.

References

1805 births
1863 deaths
Politicians from Litchfield, Connecticut
Politicians from Minneapolis
People from Red Wing, Minnesota
Yale Law School alumni
Minnesota Territory judges
19th-century American judges
Lawyers from Minneapolis
19th-century American lawyers